Africanictis is an extinct genus of carnivorous cat-like mammals belonging to the superfamily Aeluroidea, endemic to Africa for approximately , from 23.03 to 11.610 Ma, during the Miocene epoch.

Africanictis is thought to have had an omnivorous—or more precisely hypercarnivorous to mesocarnivorous—diet.

Taxonomy
Africanictis was named by Morales et al. (1998). It was assigned to Stenoplesictidae by Morlo et al. (2007).

References

Miocene feliforms
Miocene mammals of Africa
Prehistoric carnivoran genera